This was the first edition of the tournament.

Hsieh Cheng-peng and Peng Hsien-yin won the title after defeating Andre Begemann and Aliaksandr Bury 3–6, 6–4, [10–7] in the final.

Seeds

Draw

References
 Main Draw

International Challenger Quanzhou - Doubles